Azlan Ismail (born 3 October 1984, in Tumpat, Kelantan) is a Malaysian footballer currently playing as a forward for T–Team in Malaysia Super League. He is a former Malaysia national football team player.

Career
Azlan was the first player to score a hat-trick in the 2010 season of the Malaysian Super League. At the beginning of February 2010, he was the league's top scorer.

References

External links
 

1984 births
Malaysian people of Malay descent
Malaysian footballers
People from Kelantan
Malaysia international footballers
Living people
Perlis FA players
Kelantan FA players
Terengganu FC players
Kedah Darul Aman F.C. players
Footballers at the 2006 Asian Games
Association football forwards
Asian Games competitors for Malaysia